Dale Band (born June 30, 1969) is a Canadian retired ice hockey center who was an All-American for Colgate.

Career
Band joined the program at Colgate University in 1988 after a successful junior career with the Gloucester Rangers. He was nearly a point-per-game player as a freshman and was named to the ECAC All-Rookie team. In his sophomore season, Band helped the Raiders put together the best season in program history. The team won 30 games for the first time and reached the NCAA championship game. The team declined the following year but Band's scoring production spiked. For his senior season, Band was named team captain and led the team through a difficult season. He held the team together after their head coach, Terry Slater died due to a stroke in December. Despite the tragedy, Colgate finished out the year with Band being named an All-American. He retired from the game following his graduation.

Statistics

Regular season and playoffs

Awards and honors

References

External links

1969 births
Living people
Ice hockey people from Ottawa
Canadian ice hockey centres
Colgate Raiders men's ice hockey players
AHCA Division I men's ice hockey All-Americans